Farshad Hashemi (born 20 January 1997) is an Iranian professional footballer who plays as a midfielder for Persian Gulf Pro League club Padideh.

Career

Siah Jamegan
Mosleh played for Saipa before moving to Siah Jamegan in summer of 2016.

Persepolis
On 18 June 2017 Farshad joined Persian Gulf Pro League club Persepolis on a three-year contract.

References

External links
 
 

Living people
1997 births
Iranian footballers
Association football midfielders
Siah Jamegan players
Saipa F.C. players
Shahr Khodro F.C. players
Naft Tehran F.C. players
Persian Gulf Pro League players
Sportspeople from Mashhad